The following outline is provided as an overview of and topical guide to Boston:

Boston – capital city and most populous municipality of the Commonwealth of Massachusetts in the United States. It is also the seat of Suffolk County, although the county government was disbanded on July 1, 1999. Boston is one of the oldest cities in the United States, founded on the Shawmut Peninsula in 1630 by Puritan settlers from England. It was the scene of several key events of the American Revolution, such as the Boston Massacre, the Boston Tea Party, the Battle of Bunker Hill, and the Siege of Boston.

General reference 

 Pronunciation:
  
  
 Common English name(s): Boston
 Official English name(s): City of Boston
 Nicknames of Boston:
 The Cradle of Liberty
 Beantown
 Adjectival(s): Bostonian
 Demonym(s): Bostonian

Geography of Boston 

Geography of Boston
 Boston is:
 a city
 the county seat of Suffolk County
 the capital of the State of Massachusetts
 primate city of the State of Massachusetts
 Population of Boston: 673,184 (2016)
 Area of Boston:  89.63 sq mi (232.14 km2)
 Atlas of Boston

Location of Boston 

 Boston is situated within the following regions:
 Northern Hemisphere and Western Hemisphere
 North America
 Northern America
 United States
 Northeastern United States
 Northeast megalopolis
 New England
 Massachusetts
 Greater Boston
 Suffolk County
 Time zone(s):

Environment of Boston

Landforms of Boston

Areas of Boston

Districts of Boston

Neighborhoods in Boston 

Neighborhoods of Boston

Locations in Boston

Parks and gardens in Boston 

Park and gardens in Boston

Historic locations in Boston

Demographics of Boston 

Demographics of Boston

Government and politics of Boston 

Government and politics of Boston
 Government of Boston
 Mayors of Boston
 Boston City Council
 Law enforcement in Boston
 Boston Police Department
 International relations of Boston
 Sister cities of Boston
 Sister cities of Boston

History of Boston 

History of Boston
 Timeline of Boston

History of Boston, by period
 Timeline of Boston

History of Boston, by subject 

 Battle of Boston
 Siege of Boston
 History of African Americans in Boston
 History of Irish Americans in Boston
 History of Italian Americans in Boston
 History of Korean Americans in Boston
 History of the Boston Braves
 History of the Boston Celtics
 History of the Boston Red Sox
 History of the New England Patriots

Culture of Boston 

Culture of Boston
 Architecture of Boston
 Tallest building in Boston
 Cuisine of Boston
 Events in Boston
 Annual events in Boston
 Media in Boston
 Museums in Boston
 People from Boston
 Symbols of Boston
 Flag of Boston

Art in Boston

Cinema of Boston 

Cinema of Boston
 Boston International Film Festival

Music of Boston 

Music of Boston
 Boston Philharmonic Orchestra
 Songs about Boston

Religion in Boston 

 Cemeteries in Boston
 Christianity in Boston
 Bishop of Boston
 Catholicism in Boston
 Roman Catholic Archdiocese of Boston

Sports in Boston 

 History of the Boston Braves
Sports in Boston
 Baseball in Boston
 Boston Red Sox
 History of the Boston Red Sox
 List of Boston Red Sox managers
 Boston Red Sox Hall of Fame
 Boston Red Sox Radio Network
 Boston Red Sox all-time roster
 Boston Red Sox coaches
 Baseball parks in Boston
 Basketball in Boston
 Boston Celtics
 Boston Celtics Radio Network
 Boston Celtics all-time roster
 History of the Boston Celtics
 Boston Celtics draft history
 List of Boston Celtics accomplishments and records
 List of Boston Celtics broadcasters
 List of Boston Celtics head coaches
 List of Boston Celtics seasons
 Football in Boston
 American football in Boston
 New England Patriots
 History of the New England Patriots
 New England Patriots seasons
 2007 New England Patriots videotaping controversy
 2007 New England Patriots–New York Giants game
 New England Patriots broadcasters
 New England Patriots Cheerleaders
 New England Patriots head coaches
 New England Patriots players
 New England Patriots first-round draft picks
 New England Patriots starting quarterbacks
 New England Patriots Radio Network
 New England Patriots strategy
 Soccer in Boston
 Boston Braves F.C.
 Hockey in Boston
 Boston Bruins
 Boston Bruins Ice Girls
 Boston Bruins Radio Network
 List of Boston Bruins players
 Running in Boston
 Boston Marathon
 List of winners of the Boston Marathon
 Boston Marathon Qualifying Standards
 Boston Marathon bombing

Economy and infrastructure of Boston 

Economy of Boston
 Communications in Boston
 Media in Boston
 Public services in Boston
 Boston Fire Department
 Boston Police Department
 Boston Public Library

Transportation in Boston 

Transport in Boston
 Air transport in Boston
 Airports in Boston
 Maritime transport in Boston
 Port of Boston
 Rail transit in Boston
 Boston subway
 List of Boston subway stations
 Road transport in Boston
 Buses in Boston
 List of MBTA bus routes in East Boston, Chelsea, and Revere
 List of MBTA bus routes in South Boston
 Cycling in Boston

Education in Boston 

Education in Boston
 Secondary education in Boston
 List of colleges and universities in metropolitan Boston
 List of colleges in Boston
 Boston College
 List of Boston College people
 Boston College Center for Corporate Citizenship
 Boston College Center for Work and Family
 Boston College Club Hockey
 Boston College Eagles
 Boston College Eagles baseball
 Boston College Eagles football
 Boston College Eagles football statistical leaders
 Boston College Eagles ice hockey
 Boston College Eagles men's basketball
 Boston College Eagles men's ice hockey
 Boston College Eagles men's soccer
 Boston College Eagles softball
 Boston College Eagles sports radio networks
 Boston College Eagles women's basketball
 Boston College Eagles women's ice hockey
 Boston College Graduate School of Arts & Sciences
 Boston College High School
 Boston College Law Review
 Boston College Law School
 Boston College Main Campus Historic District
 Boston College Marching Band
 Boston College Media Research and Action Project
 Boston College Men's Squash
 Boston College Rugby Football Club
 Boston College School of Social Work
 Boston College School of Theology and Ministry
 Boston College–Harvard men's basketball rivalry
 Boston College–Holy Cross football rivalry
 Boston College–Syracuse football rivalry
 Boston College–UMass football rivalry
 Boston College–Virginia Tech football rivalry
 Universities in Boston
 University of Boston
 List of Boston University people
 Boston University Academy
 Boston University Bridge
 Boston University Brussels
 Boston University Center for Philosophy and History of Science
 Boston University Central (MBTA station)
 Boston University College of Arts and Sciences
 Boston University College of Communication
 Boston University College of Engineering
 Boston University College of Fine Arts
 Boston University College of General Studies
 Boston University College of Health and Rehabilitation Sciences (Sargent College)
 Boston University Debate Society
 Boston University Division of Emerging Media Studies
 Boston University East (MBTA station)
 Boston University Housing System
 Boston University Libraries
 Boston University Medical Campus
 Boston University Metropolitan College
 Boston University Photonics Center
 Boston University Police Department
 Boston University School of Education
 Boston University School of Law
 Boston University School of Medicine
 Boston University School of Public Health
 Boston University School of Social Work
 Boston University School of Theology
 Boston University Tanglewood Institute
 Boston University Terriers
 Boston University Terriers football
 Boston University Terriers ice hockey
 Boston University Terriers men's basketball
 Boston University Terriers men's ice hockey
 Boston University Terriers women's basketball
 Boston University Terriers women's ice hockey
 Boston University Track and Tennis Center
 Boston University West (MBTA station)
 Boston University–Holy Cross rivalry

See also 

 Outline of geography
 Outline of Massachusetts
 Index of Massachusetts-related articles
 List of airports in the Boston area
 List of people from Boston
 List of songs about Boston
 List of tallest buildings in Boston
 List of television shows set in Boston

References

External links 

Boston
Boston